The Yarrabubba impact structure is the eroded remnant of an impact crater, situated in the northern Yilgarn Craton near Yarrabubba Station between the towns of Sandstone and Meekatharra, Mid West Western Australia. With an age of 2.229 billion years, it is the oldest known impact structure on Earth.

Description 
While the rim of the original crater has been completely eroded and is not readily visible on aerial or satellite images, it is centered on a feature called the Barlangi Rock. The evidence for the extent of impact comes from the presence of shocked quartz and shatter cones in outcrops of granite interpreted to be near the centre of the original crater, and from geophysical data.

Age 
The impact has been dated to 2,229 ± 5 million years ago, making it the world's oldest confirmed impact structure. This date places the impact in the early Rhyacian, around the end of the Huronian glaciation.

The age finding was based on analysis of ancient crystals of the minerals zircon and monazite found in the crater.  Scientists used uranium-lead dating to analyze the samples and to determine the age of the impact crater.

See also
 List of impact craters on Earth
 Impact crater

References

External links
 Precise radiometric age establishes Yarrabubba, Western Australia, as Earth’s oldest recognised meteorite impact structure, Timmons M. Erickson, Christopher L. Kirkland, Nicholas E. Timms, Aaron J. Cavosie & Thomas M. Davison, January 21, 2020. Nature Communications volume 11.

Impact craters of Western Australia
Proterozoic impact craters
Precambrian Australia
Mid West (Western Australia)